Mephenesin (INN) is a centrally acting muscle relaxant. It can be used as an antidote for strychnine poisoning. Mephenesin however presents with the major drawbacks of having a short duration of action and a much greater effect on the spinal cord than the brain, resulting in pronounced respiratory depression at clinical doses and therefore a very low therapeutic index. It is especially dangerous and potentially fatal in combination with alcohol and other depressants.  Mephenesin was used by Bernard Ludwig and Frank Berger to synthesize meprobamate, the first tranquilizer to see widespread clinical use.  Mephenesin is no longer available in North America but is used in Italy and a few other countries. Its use has largely been replaced by the related drug methocarbamol, which is better absorbed.

Mephenesin may be an NMDA receptor antagonist. Mephenesin was previously used in France as an OTC muscle relaxant called Décontractyl but was taken out of production by Sanofi Aventis and due to a French Health Ministry decree in July 2019. Mephenesin is, however, still available in Italy.

See also
 Chlorphenesin
 Guaifenesin
 Mephenoxalone
 Methocarbamol
 Prenderol

External links

References

Diols
Drugs with unknown mechanisms of action
Muscle relaxants
Phenol ethers